Shamrock is a Filipino alternative/pop rock band originating from Manila, Philippines. They are known for their single "Alipin".

Members

Current members
Bradley Holmes (vocals)
Sam Santos (bassist)
Nico Capistrano (guitarist)
Harald Huyssen (drummer)

Former member 
Marc Tupaz (vocals; hiatus)
Henry Abesamis (keyboards)

Discography

Studio albums

Demo
Ikaw Lang (2008)

Singles
"Alipin"
"Naalala Ka" (Sassy Girl theme song)
"Sana"
"Miss Serious"
"Nandito Lang Ako" (Captain Barbell theme song)
"Sandata" (Captain Barbell theme song)
"Hold On" (Jumong theme song)
"Paano"
"Ngiti"
"Haplos"
"Ikaw Lang"
"Just a Smile Away"
"Wag Kang Matakot" (Joaquin Bordado theme song)
"All I Need"
"Pagkakataon" feat. Rachelle Ann Go

References

Filipino rock music groups
2003 establishments in the Philippines
Musical groups established in 2003
Musical groups from Manila